Dominique Dupuy (born 1957) is a French racing driver.

Dominique Dupuy may also refer to:
Dominique Dupuy (biologist) (1812–1885), a French botanist and malacologist
Dominique Dupuy (dancer) (born 1930), French dancer and choreographer of modern dance
Dominique Martin Dupuy (1767–1798), French revolutionary leader